Isofurans are nonclassic eicosanoids formed nonenzymatically by free radical mediated peroxidation of arachidonic acid.  The isofurans are similar to the isoprostanes and are formed under similar conditions, but contain a substituted tetrahydrofuran ring.  The concentration of oxygen affects this process; at elevated oxygen concentrations, the formation of isofurans is favored whereas the formation of isoprostanes is disfavored.

References

Eicosanoids